

Austrian

 von Arnstein, Arnsteiner
 von Biedermann
 von Auspitz
 Bloch von Blochhaimb 
 von Brunicki[de]
 Elkan von Elkansberg (later Bavaria)
 von Ephrussi
 von Eskeles
 Ritter von Fischer
 von Fould-Springer
 Frydman, Ritter von Prawy (cf. Marcel Prawy)
 von Goldschmidt
 von Goldberg
 Armand von Goldberg
 von Gomperz
 von Gutmann (cf. Elisabeth von Gutmann)
 Haber von Lindsberg
 von Heine-Geldern, Heine von Geldern (Freiherr & Baron, Gustav, Robert)
 von Henikstein (Hönigstein)
 Hofmann von Hofmannsthal
 Joel von Joelson
 von Lieben
 von Löwenthal
 von Katzellenbourg
 von Mises
 Ludwig von Mises, economist
 Richard von Mises
 von Motesiczky
 de Morpurgo
 von Oppenheim
 Parente
 Porges - von Portheim
 Reinach
 von Rosenberg-Redé
 Rothschild banking family of Austria
 von Seligmann
 von Sonnenfels (Christian)
 von Todesco
 Wartenegg
 von Wertheimstein
 Weil von Weilen
 von Wittgenstein of Vienna (Christian)
 Paul Wittgenstein
 Ludwig Wittgenstein
 von Zemlinsky

Belgian
 Baron Henich Apfelbaum
 Baron Lambert
 Baron Jacques Brotchi
 Baron Julien Klener
 Francisco de Silva y Solis (Marquis de Montfort): Military commander under Emperor Leopold I; greatly aided in the defeat of the French François de Créquy in 1675. He settled in Antwerp as a professed Jew.

British
 See list of British Jewish nobility and gentry

Czech
 Jacob Bassevi
 Bloch von Blochhaimb

Dutch
 Lopes Suasso: family whose nobility was confirmed between 1818 and 1831, extinct in 1970 (notable member: Francisco Lopes Suasso, Baron d'Avernas le Gras (1657–1710), one of the leading shareholders of the West India Company, one of the most ardent supporters of the House of Orange, he supported William of Orange in 1688, in his invasion of England)
 Salvador: family members ennobled in 1821, extinct 1975
 Teixeira de Mattos: family members ennobled between 1817 and 1892 (to which family belongs the non noble translator Alexander Teixeira de Mattos)
 Goldman, Jonkheer.

French
 Cahen d'Anvers
 Rothschild banking family of France

German

Between 1819 and 1900, a number of titles were conferred on Jews. Of a sample of 700 German nobles created during this period, 62 were Jewish.

 Auerbach
 Bleichröder
 Diane von Fürstenberg (née Halfin)
 Prince Alexander von Fürstenberg
 Talita von Fürstenberg
 Princess Tatiana von Fürstenberg
 Hirsch auf Gereuth
 Kaulla
 Oppenheim
 Baroness Karin von Ullmann (née Oppenheim)
 Baron Georg von Ullmann
 Countess Ilona von Krockow
 Baroness Gertrud von Puttkamer (née Günther)
 Reinach
 Reuter
 Rotbert
 Rothschild
 von Schwarzau (originally de Suasso)
 von Strauss
 von Weinberg
Carl von Weinberg
 von Gil
 Von Collen/von Cölln
 Hecht
Aviel Justice Stein (commonly known as Avi Stein)

Hungarian

 Biedermann 
 Baron Adolf Kohner de Szaszberek
 Fischer
 Goldberger de Buda
 Hatvany-Deutsch
 Hevesy von Bischitz
 Hollitscher
 Jüllich
 Königswarter
 Zsigmond Kornfeld
 von Lieben
 László de Lombos
 von Neumann
 Ronai (Baron Herman Weinberger von Rόna)
 von Rosenberg-Redé
 Schey von Koromla
 Szitányi Ullmann
 von Wertheimstein
 Zuckerkandl

Italian
 Baron Lumbroso, said to be from Egyptian-Jewish origin
 Baron Mazza, Naples
 Baron Albert Grant Albert Grant (company promoter)
 del Castelo
 Paradiso
 Camondo
 Rothschild banking family of Naples
 Tedesco
 Mendola, Palermo
 Montini
 The Franchetti Barons
 Reinach
 Senigaglia family
 Vigil
 Conte Cahen d'Anvers and Cahen di Torre Alfina (marchese)

Portuguese

 Baron Diego Pereira d'Aguilar, Portuguese-born London-based Jewish businessman, created a baron of the Holy Roman Empire by Empress Maria Theresa of Austria.
 Baron Ephraim Lópes Pereira d'Aguilar, second Baron d'Aguilar, a Barony of the Holy Roman Empire.
 Baron Harry Emanuel de Almeda
 David de Stern, German-born British holder of a Portuguese viscountcy
 Hermann de Stern, German-born British holder of a Portuguese barony

Russian

Baron Peter Shafirov (1670–1739), vice-chancellor of Russia under Peter the Great
 Babanin family, a noble family that originated in the Tsardom of Russia
 Günzburg, also Gunzbourg
 Baron Joseph Günzburg, Osip Gintsburg, or Iosif-Evzel Gabrielovich Gintsburg (1812, Vitebsk - 1878, Paris), Industrialist
 Baron Horace Günzburg, Goratsiy Evzelevich Gintsburg, Naftali-Gerts Evzelevich Ginstsburg (1833, Zvenigorodka, Kiev province - 1909, St. Petersburg), Financier, Industrialist
 Baron Alexander Günzburg, Aleksandr Goratsievich Gintsburg (1863, Paris - 1948, Switzerland)
Baron David Goratsiyevich Günzburg (Барон Давид Горациевич Гинцбург David Goratsievich Gintsburg, July 5, 1857, Kamenetz-Podolsk - December 22, 1910, St. Petersburg) was a Russian orientalist and Jewish communal leader.
 Baron Nicolas de Gunzburg, (1904–1981) socialite, editor, actor, producer.
 Grinkrugi
 Ephron
Ephrussi
 Kanegissery
 Krupa/Kruppa
 Polyakova
 Dobrowolski Counts (later Dobrow), Russian and Polish family
 Gantsmakher
 Khaykin
Ransohov
 Wertheim (Poland)
 Nasonov
 
Ulyanov

Spanish

 Aboab
 Abravanel
 Arditti - of the Aragonese court
 Bargallo
 Benveniste
 Maluenda
 De la Cavalleria
 Marmol
 Cabrera
 Carvajal
 Camondo
 Cohen
 Curiel
 Flores
 Nahon
 Paredes
 Roditi
 Safira
 Saltiel (Shaltiel)
 Senior Coronel
 Surel
 Verdugo (Berdugo)
 Vázquez
 Vigil

See also
Court Jew
Jewish heraldry

References

External links
 Coat of arms (Jewish Encyclopedia)
 Pedigree (Jewish Encyclopedia)
 Jewish nobility (heraldica.org)

Nobilities
Jewish
Lists of nobility
 Nobility,European